is a town located in Chita District, Aichi Prefecture, Japan. , the town had an estimated population of 28,291 in 10,682 households, and a population density of 1,189 persons per km².

Geography
Agui is located in an inland area of northwestern Chita Peninsula in southern Aichi Prefecture. It is located approximately 30 minutes by car or express train from downtown Nagoya. The highest elevation is 74.7 meters above sea level.

Neighboring municipalities
Aichi Prefecture
Higashiura
Tokoname
Chita
Handa

Demographics
Per Japanese census data, the population of Agui has been relatively steady over the past 50 years.

Climate
The town has a climate characterized by hot and humid summers, and relatively mild winters (Köppen climate classification Cfa).  The average annual temperature in Agui is 15.5 °C.

History
The name of Agui is very ancient, and appears in Asuka and Nara period records. During the Muromachi period, the area was the territory of the Hisamatsu clan, and later came under the control of Oda Nobunaga.  The village of Agui was founded in October 1889 with the establishment of the modern municipalities system, and became a town on January 1, 1953.

There was a failed attempt to merge with Handa located in the south of Agui due to lack of votes in the referendum in December 26, 2004. As a result, no merges occurred in the 10 municipalities in Chita utilizing the Chubu Centrair International Airport.

Economy
Agui is largely an agricultural center, and is bedroom community for the city of Nagoya.

Education
Agui has four public elementary schools and one public junior high school operated by the town government, and one public high school operated by the Aichi Prefectural Board of Education. The Institute of Sports Medicine and Science is located in Agui.

Transportation

Railway
 Meitetsu – Kōwa Line
 -  -  -

Highway
Agui is not served by any national highways.

Local attractions
Sakabe Castle ruins, ancestral home of the Hisamatsu clan
Tōun-in, Buddhist temple, bodaiji for the mother of Tokugawa Ieyasu
Agui Baseball Stadium

References

External links

Official website 

 
Towns in Aichi Prefecture